Featheroides is a genus of Chinese jumping spiders that was first described by X. J. Peng in 1994.  it contains only two species, found only in China: F. typica and F. yunnanensis.

References

Further reading
 

Salticidae genera
Salticidae
Spiders of China